José Antonio Aguilar Bodegas (born 28 December 1949) is a Mexican politician and member of the Institutional Revolutionary Party. He was candidate of the Allianza por Chiapas (PRI-PVEM coalition) for governor of Chiapas.

José Antonio Aguilar was born in Tapachula, Chiapas. He graduated from Universidad del Valle de México with a BA in industrial relations, as well as a master's degree in public administration from the same institution.

He was a municipal president of Tapachula, federal deputy in the LVII Legislature, local deputy in the Congress of Chiapas and Senator of the Republic from his state during the LIX Legislature (2000–2006).

On 6 April 2006, Aguilar was nominated as the candidate of his party to the Governor of Chiapas in the 2006 elections. According to the official figures of the assemblies, held on August 20, the candidate of the coalition PRD-PT-Convergence, Juan José Sabines, obtained 553 thousand 270 votes, while the standard bearer of the Alliance by Chiapas, José Antonio Aguilar, achieved 546 thousand 988 votes. The difference among both contenders was of barely 6 thousand 282 votes, what represents an advantage of only 0.57 percent of the voting.

The Alliance for Chiapas, conformed by the PRI and the PVEM and subsequently with the de facto adhesion of the PAN and PANAL parties, challenged the computation for the election of governor in 580 polling stations of the 24 electoral districts. Before this challenge, the State Electoral Tribunal of Chiapas should emit its failure to more delay on September 30. To be confirmed the results of the election, Aguilar has announced that its party will resort to Federal Electoral Tribunal (TRIFE), which should emit the final and unappealable opinion to more delay 7 December 2006, a day before the eventual one takes of possession of the Governor of Chiapas for the period 2006-2012.

See also 
 2006 Chiapas state election

References

External links 
 Official site of José Antonio Aguilar Bodegas

1949 births
Living people
People from Tapachula
Institutional Revolutionary Party politicians
Deputies of the LVII Legislature of Mexico
Members of the Senate of the Republic (Mexico)
Municipal presidents in Chiapas
Members of the Congress of Chiapas
21st-century Mexican politicians
Universidad del Valle de México alumni
Politicians from Chiapas
20th-century Mexican politicians